Jacob A. Ambler (February 18, 1829 – September 22, 1906) was an American lawyer and politician who served as a U.S. Representative from Ohio for two terms from 1869 to 1873.

Early life and career
Born in Pittsburgh, Pennsylvania, Ambler attended the local schools of Allegheny City and also received private instruction.
He moved to Salem, Ohio, and studied law in his brother's law office.
He was admitted to the bar on March 27, 1851, and commenced practice in Salem, Ohio.

Political career
Ambler was elected to the State house of representatives in 1857 and served two terms.
He was appointed judge of the ninth judicial district in 1859 and served until 1867.

Congress
Ambler was elected as a Republican to the Forty-first and Forty-second Congresses (March 4, 1869 – March 3, 1873).
He declined to be a candidate for renomination in 1872.

Later career and death
He resumed the practice of law and also became interested in various business enterprises in Salem, Ohio.
He served as vice president of a bank and of a steel and wire nail mill corporation and also as president of a publishing company.
He served as a delegate to every Republican National Convention between 1876 and 1896.
He was appointed a member of the United States Tariff Commission by President Arthur in 1882.
He retired from the general practice of law in 1898 but continued active business pursuits until his death in Canton, Ohio, September 22, 1906.
He was interred in Hope Cemetery, Salem, Ohio.

Sources

1829 births
1906 deaths
Republican Party members of the Ohio House of Representatives
Ohio state court judges
Ohio lawyers
People from Salem, Ohio
19th-century American politicians
19th-century American judges
Republican Party members of the United States House of Representatives from Ohio